Milan Čančarević (Serbian Cyrillic: Милан Чанчаревић; born 21 May 1955) is a Serbian former footballer and current coach.

Career
As a player, he played for Napredak, Sloboda Užice and FAP Priboj in the Yugoslav First League and Yugoslav Second League. He also had a stint with Fortuna Düsseldorf in the 2. Bundesliga. After retiring, Čančarević became a coach, where he coached various clubs like Bane Raška, Borac Cacak, and Sloboda Užice. In 2008, he went abroad to coach the Serbian White Eagles FC of the Canadian Soccer League. During his time in Canada he won the CSL Championship after defeating Trois-Rivières Attak 2-1 in a penalty shootout. 

In 2011, he returned to Serbia to coach FK Loznica. In 2015, he was appointed the manager for Zlatibor Čajetina. He was the head coach for FK Polimlje in the Drina Zone League in 2018.

His son Ognjen is a professional goalkeeper.

Honours

Manager
Serbian White Eagles
 CSL Championship: 2008

References 

1955 births
Living people
People from Požega, Serbia
Serbian footballers
Serbian football managers
Serbian expatriate football managers
Expatriate soccer managers in Canada
Expatriate footballers in Germany
Serbian expatriate sportspeople in Canada
Yugoslav footballers
Yugoslav First League players
FK Napredak Kruševac players
FK Sloboda Užice players
1. FC Saarbrücken players
Fortuna Düsseldorf players
Serbian White Eagles FC managers
Canadian Soccer League (1998–present) managers
Association football midfielders